Mexia  is an unincorporated community in Monroe County, Alabama, United States. Mexia has a post office with ZIP code 36458. Mexia has two small historic cemeteries on Thompson Road and Rolland Road. The largest church in Mexia is Mexia Baptist Church located on Old Salem Road. In Mexia there is also New Chapel Baptist Church located on Snowden Road, and Old Salem Baptist Church located on Old Salem Creek Road.

References

Unincorporated communities in Monroe County, Alabama
Unincorporated communities in Alabama